Sympistis subsimplex is a moth of the family Noctuidae first described by Harrison Gray Dyar Jr. in 1904. It is found in North America, including Arizona.

References

subsimplex
Moths described in 1904